Zhang Xiaowen (born 24 February 1989 in Shanghai) is a Chinese chess player who holds the FIDE title of Woman Grandmaster (WGM). She won the Asian Women's Continental Individual Championship which took place in May 2009 in Subic Bay Freeport Zone. In April 2011 she won the Chinese Women's Chess Championship. Her highest rating is 2437 as of March 2010.

References

External links

1989 births
Living people
Chinese female chess players
Chess woman grandmasters
Chess players from Shanghai